The Lainong people, also known as the Lainong Naga, are a Tibeto-Burmese ethnic group that mostly resides in Naga Self-Administered Zone in Myanmar. They are one of the major Naga ethnic group of Myanmar and mostly inhabiting the Lahe and Hkamti Townships in Myanmar.

References

Naga people
Ethnic groups in Myanmar